Joey Jones is a British journalist who was Deputy Political Editor of Sky News.

He was educated at Jesus College, Oxford where he read History and English. He previously reported for BBC Radio Devon and Euronews.

In 2015, he left Sky News in order to become a Press Advisor in the Technological industry  In May 2016, Jones was appointed as the official spokesman for Conservative MP Theresa May. In September 2016, he joined Weber Shandwick and became their new head of public affairs, replacing David Skelton.

References

Year of birth missing (living people)
Living people
Alumni of Jesus College, Oxford
Sky News newsreaders and journalists